Twin Valley School District (TVSD) is a school district headquartered in Caernarvon Township, Berks County, Pennsylvania, with an Elverson postal address.

Within Berks County the district includes Caernarvon Township (including the Berks County part of Morgantown), New Morgan, and Robeson Township (including Gibraltar). Within Chester County the district includes Elverson, Honey Brook, Honey Brook Township, and West Nantmeal Township.

History

The school district was established in 1955.

The Twin Valley Junior-Senior High School, completed some time before 1960, had a cost of about $2.1 million. In 1960 there was a controversy over some Amish men who were jailed for not allowing their children to attend the junior-senior high school. The Twin Valley School District's board of trustees required that if the Amish men wished to give a religious education, they should not home school and instead incorporate a formal school of their own. The principal of the high school stated that it would not be feasible for the school district to operate a one room schoolhouse at the middle school for the Amish children.

In 2022 the district had 3,000 students.

The district has a Native American mascot. In 2022 the superintendent opposed a measure to change the mascot, as did the school board.

Schools
 Secondary schools
 Twin Valley High School (Caernarvon Township, Elverson address)
 Twin Valley Middle School (Caernarvon Township, Elverson address)
 Elementary schools
 Honey Brook Elementary Center (Honey Brook Township, Honey Brook address)
 Robeson Elementary Center (Robeson Township, Birdsboro address)
 The school bus services transport 90 to 95% of the students. The Berks County government described the school's attendance boundary as "large".
 Twin Valley Elementary Center (Elverson)
 Its attendance boundary includes areas east of Interstate 176 and southeast of Pennsylvania Route 82.

References

External links
 Twin Valley School District

School districts in Bucks County, Pennsylvania
School districts in Chester County, Pennsylvania
1955 establishments in Pennsylvania
School districts established in 1955